Mlondi Edward Dlamini (3 March 1997 – 8 October 2017) was a South African professional footballer who played for Maritzburg United, as a midfielder. He died in a car accident on 8 October 2017.

References

1997 births
2017 deaths
South African soccer players
Maritzburg United F.C. players
South African Premier Division players
Association football midfielders
People from uMngeni Local Municipality
Soccer players from KwaZulu-Natal
Road incident deaths in South Africa